Mahkepar Road railway station serves Mahkepar and surrounding villages in the Balaghat district of Madhya Pradesh, India.

References

Railway stations in Balaghat district
Nagpur SEC railway division